(Ghost Story of Kasane Swamp), also known as The Depths, or The Ghost of Kasane, is a 1957 black-and-white/ Scope Japanese horror film directed by Nobuo Nakagawa for Shintoho Films. The screenplay was based on a story called Shinkei Kasanegafuchi by Encho Sanyutei. The film was never dubbed in English and is only available in subtitled format. It was a short film, running 57 minutes.

Daiei Film remade this film twice, once in 1960 (B&W/full screen) as Kaidan Kasane-ga-fuchi, and again in 1970 (Color/Scope) as The Masseur's Curse (both directed by Kimiyoshi Yasuda). The 1960 version was never shown in the United States, nor was it dubbed in English.

Cast 
 Tetsurō Tamba
 Katsuko Wakasugi
 Takashi Wada
 Noriko Kitazawa
 Kikuko Hanaoka

References

External links 
 http://divxplanet.com/sub/m/10502/Kaidan-Kasane-ga-fuchi.html
 
 http://www.jmdb.ne.jp/1957/cg002700.htm

Japanese horror films
1957 films
Films directed by Nobuo Nakagawa
Shintoho films
1957 horror films
1950s ghost films
1950s Japanese films